The Sabbath Stones (1996) is a compilation album of Black Sabbath songs taken from albums ranging from 1983's Born Again to 1995's Forbidden. It was never formally released in the US or Canada, and was the last album to be released by Black Sabbath with I.R.S. Records.

Album information
The album was created solely to fulfill Black Sabbath's contract with I.R.S. It included a short story about Black Sabbath which had some mistakes, including the misspelling of Vinny Appice's name on the front cover of the CD as "Vinnie", a mistake which also appeared on both the Mob Rules and Live Evil sleeves.

This compilation features at least one song from each of the eight Black Sabbath albums released from 1983 until 1995. This period covers all five studio albums released by the band with lead singer Tony Martin, one studio album with lead singer Ian Gillan, one with Glenn Hughes and one with Ronnie James Dio.

The version of "Headless Cross" that appears on this album starts with the last few seconds of the track "The Gates of Hell" (Which precedes "Headless Cross" on the Headless Cross album) before the opening drum line.

‘Loser Gets It All’, according to the liner notes in the album, was supposedly one of Tony Iommi’s favorite tracks to both perform and write. It was recorded during the Forbidden sessions, but only appeared on the Japanese version of the album.

Track listing

Personnel
Tony Iommi – guitars - All tracks
Geoff Nicholls – keyboards - All tracks
Tony Martin – lead vocals - Tracks 1-4, 6-7, 9-13, 16
Cozy Powell – drums - Tracks 1-7, 11-13
Neil Murray – bass - Tracks 4-7, 11-13, 16
Geezer Butler – bass - Tracks 8-10, 14
Laurence Cottle – bass - Tracks 1-3
Bobby Rondinelli – drums - Tracks 9-10
Eric Singer – drums - Track 15-16
Ronnie James Dio – lead vocals - Track 8
Vinny Appice – drums - Track 8
Bill Ward – drums - Track 14
Ian Gillan – lead vocals - Track 14
Glenn Hughes – lead vocals - Track 15
Dave Spitz – bass - Track 15
Bob Daisley – bass - Track 16

Guest musicians
Brian May – guitar solo - Track 2

Producers
Tony Iommi & Cozy Powell – Tracks 1-7
Mack for Musicland GmbH – Track 8
Leif Mases/Black Sabbath – Tracks 9, 10
Ernie C. – Tracks 11-13
Robin Black – Track 14
Jeff Glixman & Chris Tsangerides – Track 15
Jeff Glixman & V. Cooper – Track 16

See also
The Sabbath Stones - Tony Iommi Official Website

References 

Albums produced by Chris Tsangarides
Black Sabbath compilation albums
1996 compilation albums
I.R.S. Records compilation albums